The East Central Railway (abbreviated ECR) is one of the 19 railway zones in India. It is headquartered at Hajipur and comprises Sonpur, Samastipur, Danapur, Pt. Deen Dayal Upadhyaya, and Dhanbad divisions.

History 
First set up on 8 September 1996 with headquarters at Hajipur, Bihar, East Central Railway became operational  on 1 October 2002 by carving out areas from Eastern and North Eastern Railway zones currently consists of the divisions viz. Dhanbad, Danapur, Mughalsarai of Eastern Railway and Sonpur and Samastipur of North Eastern Railway. The last  13 years of its existence has been full of challenges and every obstacle was dealt in a dedicated manner despite constraints of work force and infrastructure. ECR, has a vast network of 5402.693 track kilometers and 3707.988 route kilometers encompassing the states of Bihar, Jharkhand, Uttar Pradesh and Madhya Pradesh. Out of the  route,  have been electrified. ECR has been lifeline for the people in its expanse and is playing a pivotal role in rapid development of the area. The development of infrastructure has been the major thrust area to bring about a rapid growth rate in the region and prosperity to the people. In the field of construction of new lines, doubling, gauge conversion, construction of bridges/road-over bridges, new workshop projects, Other than this qualitative and perceptible improvement in safety, cleanliness, catering, passenger amenities have been achieved to a large extent. ECR is unique in the sense that both Goods loading and Passenger traffic assume great importance in view of the huge coal loading in the coal bearing of Dhanbad division of Jharkhand state and densely populated area of Bihar. The rapid growth in both the sectors has necessitated strengthening of infrastructure of Railways. Further ECR also has uniqueness of acting as a gateway to Nepal with International traffic catering to the movement of export traffic and passengers to Nepal and vice versa.

Passenger business 
This Railway has carried 2159.08 lakh passengers in the year up to January 2015. With the running of regular express trains and passenger trains per day, besides special trains during the period April 2014 to January 2015, better traffic facilities has provided to passengers. With the increase of 5.78%, East Central Railway has registered a significant increase under gross earnings by 9774.21 crore as compared to the corresponding month of last year i.e. 9240.17 crore.

Divisions 
 Sonpur railway division
 Danapur railway division
 Dhanbad railway division
 Mughalsarai railway division
 Samastipur railway division

Routes

Lines 
 Howrah–Delhi main line
 Grand Chord
 Barauni–Guwahati line
 Barauni–Samastipur–Muzaffarpur–Hajipur line
 Muzaffarpur–Gorakhpur line (via Hajipur, Raxaul and Sitamarhi)
 Muzaffarpur–Gorakhpur main line
 Sitamarhi–Jaynagar–Nirmali line (via Sursand)
 Gaya–Kiul line
 Patna–Gaya line
 Bakhtiyarpur–Tilaiya line

Sections 
 Asansol–Patna section
 Patna–Mughalsarai section
 Barauni–Katihar section
 Samastipur–Muzaffarpur section
 Muzaffarpur–Sitamarhi section
 Muzaffarpur–Hajipur section
 Barauni–Samastipur section
Arrah–Sasaram section
 Patna–Sonepur–Hajipur section

Loco sheds 
 Electric Loco Shed, Gomoh
 Diesel & Electric Loco Shed, Samastipur
 Electric & Diesel Loco Shed, Pt. Deen Dayal Upadhyaya (Mughalsarai)
 Electric Loco Shed, Barauni
 Electric & Diesel Loco Shed, Patratu

Workshops

Samastipur Workshop 
Samastipur Workshop was established in the year 1881 for overhauling of Steam locomotives, POH of coaches and wagons. It was remodelled in 1962 for manufacture of MG wagons. In 1993, manufacturing of BOXN wagons started @1 wagon per month, in addition to the existing activity of wagon POH. POH activity of MG wagons was discontinues in June 1996 and since then this workshop is primarily engaged in production of BOXN wagons. The manufacturing of BOXNHS wagons started in June 2002. At present, the workshop is engaged in manufacturing of Stainless Steel BOXNHL wagons.

Carriage Repair Workshop, Harnaut 

ECR had no carriage repair workshop and was totally dependent on ER and NER. In order to be self-reliant and improve efficiency, workshop for overhauling of 50 coaches per month has been set up at Harnaut on Bakhtiyarpur-Rajgir section of Danapur division of East Central Railway. The workshop is spread over 75 acres of land and there is scope for future expansion. The workshop was taken over by ECR on 15 June 2012, and since then it has carried out POH of 367 Non-AC ICF coaches. Its present outturn is 25 coaches per month. The workshop is expected to reach its installed capacity in 2015–16 and in future there is plan to repair air-conditioned coaches as well.

Infrastructure

Rajendra Setu, Begusarai 
Rajendra Setu, or Simaria Bridge, is a bridge across the Ganges that was the first to link the northern and southern portions of the state of Bihar. The location of the bridge was based on the work of M. Visvesvaraya, who was more than 90 years old at the time. In a wheelchair, he visited the bridge site on the special request of Bihar's chief minister, Shri Krishna Sinha.

The road-cum-rail bridge near Hathidah in Patna district and Simaria in Begusarai district was inaugurated in 1959 by Jawaharlal Nehru, prime minister of India, and Shri Krishna Sinha. The bridge was constructed by Braithwaite, Burn & Jessop Construction Company. It is about 2 kilometres (1.2 mi) long and carries a two-lane road and a single-line railway track.

Rail-cum-Road Bridge, Patna 
The Mokama-Simaria rail link was already saturated and become a major bottleneck for increasing the number of trains between North and South Bihar. This has been a great hindrance in the industrialization of North Bihar and Nepal, which have become the important trade centre for consumable goods. Construction of Rail-cum-Road Bridge would remove the bottle-neck and both parts of Bihar will be connected by more number of trains. Trade centers of North Bihar will also be connected with the rest part of Bihar. Power houses at Barauni and Kanti who are under going expansion in North Bihar shall also be benefitted due to lessened congestion . The work of Ganga Rail Bridge at Patna was included in 1997–98 when the proposal was only for the Rail bridge but in 2006–07 the scope was increased to Rail cum Road Bridge. It was the longest Rail cum Road bridge. The dilapidated condition of the  road bridge connecting North and South Bihar in Patna (Mahatma Gandhi Setu), warrants for immediate arrangement of alternate road bridge. Understanding the problem, in the year 2005, in September 2006 scope of the project was enlarged and Rail bridge was converted into Rail cum Road bridge. The bridge would be second longest Rail-cum-Road Bridge in India with total length of 4556m. The bridge consists of 38 spans. The  Road of the bridge is connecting NH-31 of North Bihar to NH-80 of South Bihar. Gladly, work on all the 38 Spans of this mega structure was completed by December 2014. The construction of bridge was completed by 2016 and it was inaugurated by the Honourable Prime Minister of India in March 2016.

Rail-cum-Road Bridge, Munger 
The only rail link available across river Ganga in Bihar was Rajendra Bridge at Mokama. Similar is the situation for Road Bridge also. Rail-cum-Road Bridge at Munger has a revised cost of Rs. 2363 crore, in which Rs. 1116 crore share with State Government and Rs. 1247 crore share with Railway. Rail link of the bridge is connecting Jamalpur station of Sahebganj loop (Maldah Division) of Eastern Railway to Sahibpur Kamal station (Barauni-Katihar section) of East Central Railway. The bridge is 3190 m long. All the 31 spans of this bridge have been completed by December 2014. The railway part of the bridge was inaugurated in the year 2016 by the Prime Minister of India but the road took more 6 years and was inaugurated in the 2022.

Kosi Bridge 
In the year 1887, a meter gauge rail link between Nirmali and Bhaptiahi (Saraigarh) to Pratapganj up to river Kosi was provided by the Bengal North West Railway. Due to severe Ino-Nepal earthquake on 15 January 1934 (and regular flooding by river Kosi which was changing course towards West) this rail link along with Raharia railway station washed away in heavy flood owing to meandering nature of river Kosi thus from 1934 to 1956 railway section from Supaul-Pratapganj & Nirmali become non existent. 
(Indian Railway Map of 1942-43 )
(Indian Railway Map of 1956 ) 
And no attempt was made to restore this link for a long period. The Kosi Rail Bridge project included in the budget in the year 2003–04 at an estimated cost of Rs. 323 Crore. It will provide an alternative BG route of length  between Gorakhpur and Katihar via Darbhanga against the existing route of  via Chhapra and Barauni, which at present is a highly saturated corridor. This project gained exceptional significance as Silchar to Porbandar East West Corridor from Muzaffarpur to Purnia (NH 27) of NHAI shares the same location for crossing the river.

New Sone Railway Bridge 
This bridge was constructed during the year 1898. Due to introduction of clause of MBG-1987 loading, the existing bridge became the major constraint and necessitated the construction of a new alternate bridge. Traffic on this route will increase considerably when the third line between Dehri-On-Sone and Mughalsarai will become operational. The New Sone Bridge between Dehri-on-Sone and Sonenagar which has been successfully commissioned on 16 August 2014, will prove a great help in this regard.

Gandak Bridge 
A new second bridge on river Gandak has been opened between Sonpur and Hajipur for double line traffic for this section.

See also 
 All India Station Masters' Association (AISMA)
 Zones and divisions of Indian Railways

References

External links 
 East Central Railway website

Zones of Indian Railways